The 2002 Campeonato Brasileiro Série A, known as Troféu Visa Electron by sponsorship reasons, was the 46th edition of the Campeonato Brasileiro Série A. It began on August 10, 2002, and reached its end on December 15, 2002. It was the last championship with a knockout stage. The competition was won by Santos.

Format
The 26 teams played against each other once. The eight best placed teams qualified to the quarter-finals, in which the eight-placed team played against the first-placed team, the seventh-placed team played against the second-placed team, the sixth-placed team played against the third-placed team, and the fifth-placed team played against the fourth-placed team. The quarter-finals, semi-finals and finals were played over two legs. The four worst teams in the first stage were relegated to the Campeonato Brasileiro Série B of the following year.

First Stage standings

Final stage

Finals

Santos: Fábio Costa; Michel, Preto, Alex and Léo, Paulo Almeida, Renato, Elano and Diego; Robinho and Alberto. Head coach: Émerson Leão.

Corinthians: Doni; Rogério, Fábio Luciano, Scheidt and Kléber; Vampeta, Fabrício and Renato (Leandro); Deivid (Marcinho), Guilherme and Gil. Head coach: Carlos Alberto Parreira.

Corinthians: Doni; Rogério, Fábio Luciano, Anderson and Kléber; Vampeta, Fabinho (Fabrício) and Renato (Marcinho); Deivid, Guilherme (Leandro) and Gil. Head coach: Carlos Alberto Parreira.

Santos: Fábio Costa; Maurinho, André Luís, Alex and Léo; Paulo Almeida, Renato, Elano and Diego (Robert, and then Michel); Robinho and William (Alexandre). Head coach: Émerson Leão.

Final standings

Top scorers

References

External links
Campeonato Brasileiro Série A 2002 at RSSSF

Brazil
2002